Lunar Trailblazer is a planned small (class D) lunar orbiter, part of NASA's SIMPLEx program, that will detect and map water on the lunar surface to determine how its form, abundance, and location relate to geology. Its mission is to aid in the understanding of lunar water and the Moon's water cycle. Lunar Trailblazer is currently slated to launch in 2023 as a secondary payload on the IM-2 mission, with the satellite scheduled to be completed in early 2023. The Principal Investigator (PI) of the mission is Bethany Ehlmann, a professor at Caltech.

Mission 
Lunar Trailblazer was selected to be part of NASA's SIMPLEx (Small Innovative Missions for Planetary Exploration) program in 2019. The goal of the planned mission is to use a small satellite to map water on the Moon.

The mission has four scientific objectives:

 measure and map the amount, location and form (hydroxyl, H2O, or ice) of lunar water and determine any correlation to latitude and surface makeup
 study the time-variability of lunar water in sunlit portions of the Moon
 determine the form, amount, and location of lunar water in permanently shadowed parts of the Moon
 study how changes in surface temperature affect concentrations of water and ice

In addition, the spacecraft will search for good locations for future lunar landings.

Launch 
Like other NASA's SIMPLEx missions, Lunar Trailblazer will launch as a "rideshare" with another NASA or commercial mission. As of June 2022, it is planned to launch as a secondary payload on Intuitive Machines' IM-2 mission in 2023. Originally it was going to launch with IMAP in 2025, but NASA found a different rideshare opportunity since the spacecraft was scheduled to be completed in 2022.

Orbit 
Lunar Trailblazer will orbit the Moon in a 100 km polar orbit. It will study water on the Moon using its two scientific instruments.

Scientific background 

Unshielded from the vacuum of space, lunar landscapes are exposed to full illumination from the Sun for about two weeks, and total darkness for another two weeks. The Moon's day—one full rotation—is equivalent to about twenty eight Earth days. Adding to the harshness of this surface environment, the Moon has almost no atmosphere and no magnetosphere to protect it from the Sun's radiation. So, the lunar surface undergoes extreme temperature swings every day and night. During the day, temperatures near the equator are well above boiling, up to 400 K, or 260 °F. At night, these latitudes reach temperatures far below freezing (around 170 K/-150 °F at most). Any water that reaches the surface during the night would be expected to boil away during the day, or quickly sublime away in the low pressure.

On the Moon, there is no rainfall, but there are other ways that water can be delivered to the surface: micrometeorite impacts can carry water from space or excavate water from below the surface, and potentially, water could be created directly on surface minerals by implantation of hydrogen from the solar wind. Still, until very recently, scientists did not expect water to be present on most of the surface of the Moon.

In 1998, Feldman et al. showed that water ice might be present in permanently shadowed craters at the poles of the Moon. They detected the presence of hydrogen in the upper half-meter (1.5 feet) of the lunar surface, which was most likely evidence of water ice. This discovery was debated in the scientific community as missions to study the lunar surface waned and further data was unavailable—until, in 2009, LCROSS (Lunar Crater Observation and Sensing Satellite) jettisoned one of its empty propellant tanks in a controlled collision to impact an area of the Moon that lay in permanent shadow to test for the presence of ice. When the tank hit, it created a plume that was observed by both the LRO (Lunar Reconnaissance Orbiter) and the LCROSS spacecraft as well as telescopes on Earth. Tremendous amounts of data were captured from the observed plume, including signatures of water ice and other volatiles.

Also in 2009, researchers reviewing data from three separate spacecraft—Chandrayaan-1, Deep Impact, and Cassini—extracted a hydration signature throughout the whole lunar surface. This was a surprise to the lunar science community, particularly because this meant that water may be present on boiling-hot sunlit portions of the Moon. However, the instruments gathering the spectral data weren't designed to look for water, and did not have enough resolution in the 3-micron band of infrared light for researchers to distinguish between the absorption features of hydroxyl (OH), H2O, and water ice. Lunar Trailblazer's instruments are specifically designed to detect and distinguish between these three forms of water.

Spacecraft 
The Lunar Trailblazer spacecraft will be a built and tested by Lockheed Martin. It will use two deployable solar arrays, which provide 280W of power, and a chemical propulsion system. With its solar panels fully extended it will be 3.5 meters long. The spacecraft will weigh 200 kg. The spacecraft has two science instruments, High Resolution Volatiles and Minerals Moon Mapper (HVM3) and Lunar Thermal Mapper (LTM).  HVM3 is provided by JPL; LTM is provided by the University of Oxford.

Science payload 
There are two scientific instruments on the Lunar Trailblazer satellite, totaling 20 kg. The High Resolution Volatiles and Minerals Moon Mapper (HVM3) will gather and map shortwave infrared spectral data of the lunar surface. Simultaneously, Lunar Thermal Mapper (LTM) will acquire midwave infrared data. Together, the two instruments will create a simultaneous map of the surface mineral composition, temperature, and forms of lunar water, each measuring at least one thousand targets on the lunar surface over the course of the satellite's one-year primary mission.

High Resolution Volatiles and Minerals Moon Mapper (HVM3) 
The HVM3 instrument was developed by the Maturation of Instruments for Solar System Exploration (MatISSE) program, and is being manufactured by the Jet Propulsion Laboratory. It is a pushbroom short-wave infrared imaging spectrometer based on the design of the M3 instrument, which was one of the instruments to first find evidence of hydration in sunlit regions of the Moon. HVM3 has a spectral range from 0.6 to 3.6 microns—it is designed to work with high sensitivity (10 nm resolution) right at the center of water's key wavelength region in infrared light (from 2.5 to 3.5 microns) with high enough spectral resolution to differentiate between forms of water. Each pixel in an image from HVM3 will cover 50–90 meters of the lunar surface.

Lunar Thermal Mapper (LTM)
The LTM instrument is being designed and built by the University of Oxford. With eleven narrow channels between seven and ten microns and resolution smaller than 0.5 microns, it acquires multispectral images to characterize the Si-O stretch in silicates to derive mineralogical composition. At the same time, using the four broadband channels from 6 up to 100 microns, it derives surface temperature with a precision of 5K (9 °F/5 °C) in the range of 110-400K (-262 to 260 °F/-163 to 126 °C). The pixel size of LTM is 40–70 meters.

See also 

 List of missions to the Moon
LunaH-Map-A similar mission that is also part of the SIMPLEx program

References

External links 
 "Caltech | Lunar Trailblazer" at Caltech

Missions to the Moon
Lunar science
Small satellites
Lockheed Martin satellites and probes
NASA space probes
2023 in spaceflight